Khorasan Sar (also Romanized as Khorāsān Sar) is a village in Shuil Rural District, Rahimabad District, Rudsar County, Gilan Province, Iran. At the 2006 census, its population was 23, in 6 families.

References 

Populated places in Rudsar County